Eduardo Makaroff (born 4 April 1954) is an Argentinean musician, songwriter and producer. He is best known as one of the founders of Gotan Project , which has brought together the broad universe of tango with electronic music. He is currently a founding and active member of Plaza Francia Orchestra & Müller & Makaroff, both with long time collaborator Christoph H. Müller.

Biography 
Eduardo Makaroff was born in Buenos Aires in 1954. His first group was founded with his brother, Sergio, in the 1970s: Los hermanos Makaroff which also included their sister, Miranda. Then, in the 1980s, he founded the duo "Edu y el Pollo" with Daniel Mactas.

It was in 1990 that Makaroff arrived in Paris to begin his French career. Upon his arrival in Paris, Makaroff formed the group Mano a Mano, with which he produced Tango Joyeux, an album that received a very warm welcome in France and throughout Europe. He later became the conductor of a famous Parisian tango club, La Coupole, and also toured Europe with his group Tango Mano, while continuing to compose and produce music for the audiovisual industry.

In 1999, Makaroff teamed up with Christoph H. Müller and Philippe Cohen-Solal to explore new musical routes and give a different direction to the traditional music of his home country, subsequently Gotan Project was born. Gotan Project's music has been released on many, many compilation albums and has been used in a large amount of feature films and TV series.

Whilst in Paris, Makaroff met another Argentinian, Gérard Lo Monaco, to whom he gave some tango guitar lessons. Together, they went on to create the label Mañana, a label dedicated to the creation in Tango and to the development of Argentinean music in the world. Makaroff has also composed and performed film scores and television series credits. He has also presented and produced programs for television and radio.

In 2005 he co-composed with Christoph H. Müller the original music for Not Here to Be Loved, a film by Stéphane Brizé, and in 2007/2008 the soundtrack for El Gaucho, a documentary fiction film by Argentinean director Andres Jarach. The composer/producer duo Müller & Makaroff was thus born. During 2012 & 2013 Müller & Makaroff wrote music for the short film Reencuentro by Argentinean director Pablo Giorgelli (Camera d’or in Cannes for his film Las Acacias) and for Evita, a radio lecture written by Pablo Agüero starring French actress Jeanne Moreau.

In 2014, Makaroff teamed up again with Christoph H. Müller who together collaborated with vocalist Catherine Ringer to form a new band called Plaza Francia. This resulted in their 7 April 2014 release A New Tango Song Book and a subsequent French/European tour which ended in November 2015.

In 2018 Plaza Francia changed its name to Plaza Francia Orchestra and released a self titled album featuring Catherine Ringer, Lura and Maria Muliterno on vocals. They also collaborated on this record with Argentinean musicians Pablo Gignoli and Sebastian Volco. The album cover was designed by Argentinian artist Antonio Segui who was based in Paris. They started a new tour during Summer 2018 which ended in Abu Dhabi in Autumn 2019.

Makaroff and Christoph H. Müller have also re-started touring, recording & performing under the moniker Müller & Makaroff. In December 2019, they collaborate with visual artist Ian Kornfeld for a new project Antropoceno! which was released for the first time at COP25 in Madrid.

The first single Antropoceno (atentas al) featuring Fémina, Hilda Lizarazu and Mia Folino was released in the Autmumn of 2020 which was performed at the 2020 UN Global Climate Action Awards. This single was followed by Ahora featuring the voices of Greta Thunberg and David Attenborough. In May 2022 they released Todo puede suceder featuring Kevin Johansen in a joint operation with Brian Eno's EarthPercent organisation.

 Discography 

 Los Hermanos Makaroff 

 1974 : "El rock del Ascensor"
 1976 : "Areglate Gorda" (Pepe Cheto)

 Edu y el Pollo 

 1984 : "Muchas cosas"
 1984 : "Edu y el Pollo"

 Mano a Mano 

 1990 : "Tango Joyeux"
 1994 : "Sin Peluca"

 Gotan Project 

 1999 : Gotan Project "Vuelvo al sur/El capitalismo foraneo (maxi 10")"
 2000 : Gotan Project "Santa Maria (Maxi 10")"
 2000 : Gotan Project "Triptico (Maxi 10")"
 2001 : Gotan Project "La revancha del tango"
 2006 : Gotan Project "Lunatico"
 2006 : Je ne suis pas là pour être aimé (soundtrack)
 2008 : Soundtrack of the film "El gaucho"
 2010 : Gotan Project "Tango 3.0"
 2014 : Plaza Francia "A new tango songbook"
 2015 : Plaza Francia "Live Re-Experience" 
2018 : Plaza Francia Orchestra "Plaza Francia Orchestra"

 Plaza Francia 

 2014 : "A New tango Song Book"
 2018 : "Plaza Francia Orchestra"

 Filmography 

 Original music 
 Te amo (de Eduardo Calcagno) (1986)
 Je ne suis pas là pour être aimé (2005)
 Nordeste (de Juan Solanas) (2005)
 El gaucho (de Andrés Jarach), (2009)
 Au fil d'Ariane (2014)

 With Gotan Project 
 Shall We Dance – "Santa María (del buen ayre)" 2001 (http://youtu.be/4u6ycs90YIk)
 Ocean’s 12 – “El Capitalismo Foraneo” (http://vimeo.com/12067064)
 The Bourne Identity – “Época”
 The Truth about Charlie – “Época”
 Meant to Be – “Época”
 Knight & Day – “Santa María (del buen ayre)” “Santa María Pepe Braddock rmx” “Diferente”
 Lies & Alibis – "Santa María (del buen ayre)“
 Guess Who – “Queremos Paz”
 Benjamim – “Vuelvo al Sur”
 Powder Blue – “Amor Porteño"
 Tom at the Farm – "Santa María (del buen ayre)"

 Documentaries 

 Gotan Project 

 Maradona, Gamin en Or
 The Take

 TV series 

 Original Soundtrack 

 Louie (French TV series)/Didou

 With Gotan Project 

 Nip/Tuck

 S05E13 - "El Capitalismo Foráneo”
 S03E15 - “Santa María (del buen ayre)”

 Chuck

S01E03 - "Santa María (del buen ayre)“

 Sex and the City

 S06E20 - "Queremos Paz”

 Six Feet Under

 S03E09 - “Vuelvo al Sur”

 Brothers & Sisters

 S04E05 - “Santa María (del buen ayre)

 Dancing With the Stars (2009)

 Round Eight - "Santa María (del buen ayre)
 Round Six -"Mi Confesión”
 Round Three - “Cité Tango”

 So You Think You Can Dance

 USA

 Top 12 Perform (2011) - “Tríptico”
 Top 18 Perform (2008) - “Mi Confesión”

 Canada

 Top 20 (2008) - “Santa María (del buen ayre)”

 Australia

 Top 16 Perform (2008) - "Santa María (del buen ayre)“

 Awards 

 BBC Radio 3 Awards for World Music - 2003
 BBC Radio 3 Awards for World Music - 2007
Victoires de la Musique - 2003 
Grands Prix SACEM - 2010

 Distinctions 

 Chevalier des Arts et des Lettres

 References SpecificGeneral'
Eduardo Makaroff BBC interview
Ventana Latina uk Interview
Plaza Francia Review - The Guardian
Gotan Project - The Guardian
Gotan Project, Lunatico - The Guardian
Gotan Project, Roundhouse, London - The Guardian
Gotan Project - Hollywood Bowl
Plaza Francia - Sounds and Colours
1001 songs you must hear before you die 
The Gotan Project - The Age

External links 
mullerandmakaroff.com
 
 
http://www.plazafrancia.tv/
 
Eduardo Makaroff IMDB profile
http://antropoceno.earth/

1954 births
Living people
Jewish Argentine musicians
Argentine tango musicians
Electronica musicians